José Humberto Vega Vázquez (born 3 November 1957) is a Mexican politician affiliated with the PRD. As of 2013 he served as Deputy of the LXII Legislature of the Mexican Congress representing Tlaxcala.

References

1957 births
Living people
Politicians from Tlaxcala
Party of the Democratic Revolution politicians
21st-century Mexican politicians
People from Chiautempan
Universidad Autónoma Metropolitana alumni
Members of the Congress of Tlaxcala
Deputies of the LXII Legislature of Mexico
Members of the Chamber of Deputies (Mexico) for Tlaxcala